The Japanese raccoon dog (Nyctereutes viverrinus), also known as the tanuki, is a species of canid endemic to Japan. It is one of two species in the genus Nyctereutes, alongside the common raccoon dog (N. procyonoides), of which it was traditionally thought to be a subspecies (Nyctereutes procyonoides viverrinus).

The Japanese raccoon dog has a smaller stomach and shorter fur of lesser insulation value than mainland raccoon dogs. A rare, white colour type can also be found.

Within Japanese folklore, the tanuki have had a significant role since ancient times. The legendary tanuki are reputed to be mischievous and jolly, masters of disguise and shapeshifting but somewhat gullible and absentminded. The animals have also been common in Japanese art, particularly as subjects for statues.

Japanese etymology
While tanuki are prominent in Japanese folklore and proverbs, they were not always clearly distinguished from other animals with a similar appearance. In local dialects, tanuki and mujina can refer to raccoon dogs or the Japanese badger. An animal known as tanuki in one region may be known as mujina in another region. In the modern Tokyo standard dialect, tanuki refers to raccoon dogs and anaguma refers to badgers.

Tanuki is often mistakenly translated into English as "badger" or "raccoon" (as used in the English translation of the film Pom Poko and outlined in Tom Robbins' book Villa Incognito), two unrelated types of animals with superficially similar appearances. Traditionally, different areas of Japan had different names for raccoon dogs as animals, which would be used to denote different animals in other parts of the country, including badgers and wild cats; however, the official word in the standard Tokyo dialect is now tanuki, a term that also carries the folkloric significance.

Behavior
The Japanese raccoon dog is mainly nocturnal, but they are known to be active during daylight. They vocalize by growling or with groans that have pitches resembling those of domesticated cats. Like cats, the Japanese raccoon dog arches its back when it is trying to intimidate other animals; however,
they assume a defensive posture similar to that of other canids, lowering their bodies and showing their bellies to submit.

Usually social groups are limited to a breeding pair, but individual Japanese raccoon dogs may stay in a group of non-paired individuals until they find a mate.

The species is predominantly monogamous. The breeding period for the species is synchronized between females and males and lasts between February and April. A litter (typically with 4–6 pups) is born after a gestation period of 9 weeks. The parents look after their pups at a den for around a month, and then for another month after the pups leave the den. 

Japanese raccoon dogs live for 7–8 years in the wild, and have reached the age of 13 in captivity.

They have been observed to climb trees to forage for fruits and berries, using their curved claws to climb.

Taxonomy

The Japanese raccoon dog is sometimes classified as its own distinct species due to unique chromosomal, behavioral, and morphological characteristics absent in mainland raccoon dogs.  Researchers have suggested that they be considered a separate species, N. viverrinus, or that raccoon dogs of Japan could be further divisible into separate subspecies as N. p. procyonoides and N. p. albus, but both views were controversial. However, following morphological and genetic analysis across multiple studies, all of which indicated that N. viverrinus was a distinct species, it was later classified as such by the American Society of Mammalogists.

Genetic analysis has confirmed unique sequences of mtDNA, classifying the Japanese raccoon dog as a distinct isolation species, based on evidence of eight Robertsonian translocations. The International Union for Conservation of Nature Canid Group's Canid Biology and Conservation Conference in September 2001 rejected the classification of the Japanese raccoon dog as a separate species, but its status is still disputed, based on its elastic genome. The karyotype of Japanese raccoon dogs is different from that of the mainland raccoon dogs. Though it is unknown whether mainland raccoon dogs and Japanese raccoon dogs can produce fertile offspring, it is assumed that the chromosomal differences between them would have deleterious effects on the fertility of the potential offspring and this would be indicative of speciation. Aggregators on mammal taxonomy are inconsistent: Like the IUCN, Mammal Species of the World (2005) considers the Japanese raccoon dog to be a subspecies, whereas the American Association of Mammologists include N. viverrinus as a valid species in their Mammal Diversity Database.

The raccoon dogs from Hokkaido are sometimes recognized as a different subspecies from the mainland tanuki as Nyctereutes procyonoides albus (Hornaday, 1904) (or N. viverrinus albus if recognized as a distinct species). This taxon is synonymized with N. p. viverrinus in Mammal Species of the World, but comparative morphometric analysis supports recognizing the Hokkaido population as a distinct subspecific unit.

Conservation
The IUCN places the raccoon dog at "least concern" status due to the animal's wide distribution in Japan and abundant population, including as an introduced species throughout northeastern Europe. In many European countries, it is legal to hunt raccoon dogs, as they are considered a harmful and invasive species. In Japan the species is hunted mainly to prevent them from damaging crops; however, their fur is desired for use in calligraphy brushes and was exported chiefly to the United States before the outbreak of World War II. The animal is a common victim of vehicle accidents, with conservative estimates of up to 370,000 Japanese raccoon dogs being killed by vehicles each year in Japan.

In folklore and tradition

The tanuki has a long history in Japanese legend and folklore. Bake-danuki are a kind of tanuki yōkai (supernatural beings) found in the classics and in the folklore and legends of various places in Japan.

Although the tanuki is a real, extant animal, the bake-danuki that appears in literature has always been depicted as a strange, even supernatural animal. The earliest appearance of the bake-danuki in literature, in the chapter about Empress Suiko in the Nihon Shoki written during the Nara period, there are such passages as "in two months of spring, there are tanuki in the country of Mutsu, they turn into humans and sing songs". Bake-danuki subsequently appear in such classics as the Nihon Ryōiki and the Uji Shūi Monogatari. In some regions of Japan, bake-danuki are reputed to have abilities similar to those attributed to kitsune (foxes): they can shapeshift into other things or people, and can possess human beings.

Many legends of tanuki exist in the Sado Islands of Niigata Prefecture and in Shikoku, and among them, like the Danzaburou-danuki of Sado, the Kinchō-tanuki and Rokuemon-tanuki of Awa Province (Tokushima Prefecture), and the Yashima no Hage-tanuki of Kagawa Prefecture, the tanuki that possessed special abilities were given names, and even became the subject of rituals. Apart from these places, tanuki are treated with special regard in a few cases.

In popular culture

Tanuki (or their folklore version) are a recurring theme in Japanese popular culture. The first exposure of non-Japanese to tanuki usually comes through exported Japanese media. However, they are often described as "raccoons" in translation or assumed as such if no species is given.

Notable appearances of tanuki in popular culture include:

 In the 1992 Super NES video game Pocky & Rocky, one of the two playable characters is a tanuki named Rocky who defeats his enemies by shooting leaves at them. Rocky also makes appearances in the 1994, 2001, and 2022 releases in the hit series.
 In Nintendo's video games Super Mario Bros. 3, Super Mario 3D Land, Mario Kart 8, and Super Mario 3D World, Mario can wear a "Tanooki Suit". By doing so, he takes on the appearance of a tanuki and gains the ability to fly, spin his tail to attack enemies, and shapeshift into a statue, much like a bake-danuki. The same games also feature the "Super Leaf", which gives Mario tanuki ears and a tail and allows him to fly and use his tail to attack, although this form is known as Raccoon Mario; in Super Mario 3D Land and Super Mario 3D World, Mario can only transform into his Tanooki form after obtaining a Super Leaf. This power-up is based on the mythology of tanuki using leaves to help themselves transform.
 The 1994 Studio Ghibli film Pom Poko features a group of tanuki who use their shapeshifting powers to defend their habitat against human developers.
 In 2015 GitLab.com adopted a new logo of an abstracted raccoon dog and the term Tanuki.
 Tom Nook, a recurring character in the Animal Crossing video game series, is a tanuki, as well as his two employees, Timmy and Tommy. In the English versions of the games he is localized as a raccoon, although his name still alludes to tanuki. The furniture that these characters sell transforms into leaves for easy transport.
 A tanuki appears as a newscaster in the Japanese version of the American Disney computer-animated film Zootopia; the standard release of the film and releases in other countries use other animals.
 In the 2019 Sonic game Team Sonic Racing, one of the characters is a tanuki named Dodon Pa.
 The 2020 Studio Trigger TV anime BNA: Brand New Animal features main protagonist Michiru Kagemori, a humanoid shape-shifting tanuki who is often mistaken as a raccoon.
 Genshin Impact by miHoYo features the region based on Japan called Inazuma where the player can encounter tanuki who play with them and offer rewards when solving their puzzles. The tanuki even play a role in the multi-part story quest, Sacred Sakura Cleansing Ritual.
 In the Japanese manga and anime, One Piece, the character, Tony Tony Chopper is often confused for a Raccoon Dog even though he is a reindeer.

In Japanese slang, tanuki gao ("raccoon dog face") can refer to a face that looks like that of the animal, or a person's facial expression of feigned ignorance. By contrast, kitsune gao ("fox face") refers to people with narrow faces, close-set eyes, thin eyebrows, and high cheekbones.

A dish called  ("tanuki soup") ceased to contain actual tanuki meat, but some rural stews do use tanuki.

Of Japanese noodles, the words "tanuki" and "kitsune" designate two varieties of the udon or soba dishes. Neither contain any of those meats. Tanuki udon/soba contains flakes of fried tempura batter ("tenkasu"), while kitsune udon/soba contains fried tofu ("abura-age").

References

Further reading

External links

 "Report: Nyctereutes procyonoides viverrinus" in the Integrated Taxonomic Information System

Nyctereutes
 
Mammals of Japan
Endemic fauna of Japan
Mammals described in 1838
Taxa named by Coenraad Jacob Temminck
Japanese folklore
Articles containing video clips
Taxobox binomials not recognized by IUCN